Jean-Louis-Auguste Commerson (2 germinal an XI, 23 March 1803 – 24 July 1879) was a 19th-century French writer, journalist and playwright.

Short biography 
A specialist of puns and journalistic "canards" (false report launched in the media in order to mislead the public), Commerson wrote many humorous books, including Pensées d'un emballeur pour faire suite aux « Maximes » de François de La Rochefoucauld (1851), Un million de bouffonneries (1854), Le Petit Tintamarre (1857), La Petite Encyclopédie bouffonne (1860) and Un million de chiquenaudes et menus propos tirés de la Gazette de Merluchon (1880).

He also authored comédies en vaudevilles, alone or in collaboration, and established the periodical Le Tam-tam.

He signed most of his works of his surname but only occasionally used the pen names Joseph-Prudhomme and Joseph Citrouillard.

Works

Theatre 
1840: Les Trente, « drame national » in four acts and in verse
1845: Un souper sous la Régence, comédie-vaudeville in one act, with Raymond Deslandes, Théâtre des Délassements-Comiques, 15 November
1846: Les Fleurs animées, vaudeville in one act, with Charles Labie and Xavier de Montépin, Théâtre du Vaudeville, 13 July
1849: Ma tabatière ou Comment on arrive, comédie-vaudeville in four tableaux, with the Cogniard brothers, Théâtre du Gymnase-Dramatique, 15 March
1849: Une bonne fille, vaudeville in one act, Théâtre de la Porte-Saint-Martin, 11 November
1849: Les Fredaines de Troussard, vaudeville in one act, with Édouard Brisebarre and Charles Potier, Théâtre des Folies-Dramatiques, 13 November
1853: Les Deux Marguerite, vaudeville in one act, with Félix Dutertre de Véteuil, Théâtre des Variétés, 12 July
1853: La Pêche aux corsets, vaudeville in one act, with Eugène Furpille, Théâtre de la Gaîté, 22 October
1854: Un mari à l'étouffée, vaudeville in one act, with Eugène Chavette, Théâtre des Folies-Dramatiques, 28 January
1854: Les Binettes contemporaines, review in three acts and 7 tableaux, with Clairville and J. Cordier, Théâtre du Palais-Royal, 23 December
1855: Où sont les pincettes ? folie-vaudeville in one act, with Eugène Chavette, Théâtre des Folies-Dramatiques, 13 June
1855: Un suicide à l'encre rouge, vaudeville in one act, with Eugène Furpille, Théâtre de la Gaîté, 10 September
1856: Un monsieur bien mis, vaudeville in one act, with Henri Rochefort, Théâtre des Folies-Dramatiques, 10 March
1859: Le Jugement de Pâris, operetta in one act mingled with dances and extravaganza, with Ernest Alby, music by Laurent de Rillé, théâtre des Folies-Nouvelles, 11 February
1859: La Clarinette mystérieuse, vaudeville in one act, with Jules Moinaux, Théâtre des Folies-Dramatiques, 18 June
1860: Quatre femmes sur les bras, vaudeville, with Théodore Labourieu, Théâtre de la Gaîté, 17 March
1860: Le Marchand de parapluies, revue in three acts, with Paul Faulquemont, Théâtre Beaumarchais, 17 December
1864: La Vengeance de Pistache, vaudeville in one act, with Amable Bapaume, théâtre Déjazet, 26 March
1866: Doña Framboisias, folie-vaudeville in one act, with Amable Bapaume, Théâtre des Folies-Marigny, 6 July
1867: Les Vacances de Cadichet, vaudeville n one act, with Amable Bapaume, Théâtre des Folies-Dramatiques, 22 July

Texts 
1922: Les Plaisirs de la ville, poèmes dédiés aux jolies femmesText online
1825: Contes et NouvellesText online
1825: Hommage à La FayetteText online
1851: Pensées d'un emballeur pour faire suite aux « Maximes » de La Rochefoucauld, foreword by Théodore de BanvilleText online in Bibliothèque des calembours. Reprint : Garnier, 1978.
1854: Le Code civil dévoilé, dédié aux emballeurs, aux réfugiés polonais et aux gardes nationaux sans ouvrage et notamment aux licenciés de l'École de droit, pour cause d'incapacité notoire
1854: Rêveries d'un étameur, pour faire suite aux pensées de Blaise Pascal 
1854: Un million de bouffonneries, ou Le Blagorama français
1854–1855: Les Binettes contemporaines, par Joseph Citrouillard [Commerson], reviewed by Commerson, to compete with those of Eugène de Mirecourt, portraits by Nadar, 10 vol., 1854–1855 Texte en ligne 1 2 3 4 5
1857: Le Petit Tintamarre, humorous weeklyText online
1858: Lettre d'un vieux fou à un jeune sageText online
1860: Petite encyclopédie bouffonneText online
c.1880: Un million de chiquenaudes et menus propos tirés de la « Gazette de Merluchon »

Newspapers 
Le Tam-tam, magazine hebdomadaire de littérature, d'arts, de sciences et d'industrie was a newspaper published by Commerson from 1835. It would change titles several times during its publication: Le Tam-tam républicain, organe des clubs (March 1848) ; Le Tam-tam de 1848 (July 1848).

Jean-Baptiste Dalès called Dalès ainé collaborated with this paper which is sometimes called "former Tam-Tam" to distinguish it from two other publications by Commerson:
Le Tam-tam, revue critique des Polichinels politiques, financiers, religieux et autres by Napoléon Citrouillard [Commerson], specimen issue 10 March 1871 ; 
Le Tam-tam..., 1872-1877.

Quote 
According to Jacques Rouvière, the sentence "Cities should be built in the country, the air is healthier"", generally attributed to Alphonse Allais, is to be found in the Pensées d'un emballeur by Commerson. In fact, it seems that this joke already was in Le Pamphlet provisoire illustré (1848).

References 

19th-century French dramatists and playwrights
19th-century French journalists
French male journalists
Writers from Paris
1802 births
1879 deaths
19th-century French male writers